1977 in sports describes the year's events in world sport.

Alpine skiing
 Alpine Skiing World Cup
 Men's overall season champion: Ingemar Stenmark, Sweden
 Women's overall season champion: Lise-Marie Morerod, Switzerland

American football
 January 9 − Super Bowl XI: the Oakland Raiders (AFC) won 32−14 over the Minnesota Vikings (NFC)
 Location: Rose Bowl
 Attendance: 103,438
 MVP: Fred Biletnikoff, WR (Oakland)
 October 9 - Eddie Brown sets NFL record for punt returns in a game (11).
 November 20 – Playing despite a  fever as a result of the flu, Chicago Bears running back Walter Payton sets a new single-game NFL rushing record, gaining 275 yards in a 10–7 victory over the Minnesota Vikings.
 December 11 – Tampa Bay Buccaneers in their second NFL season win their first ever game over the New Orleans Saints.  The win ends their NFL record 26-game losing streak encompassing the entire 1976 season and the first 12 games in 1977.
 Sugar Bowl (1976 season):
 The Pittsburgh Panthers won 27–3 over the Georgia Bulldogs to win the college football national championship

Association football
 Liverpool dominate English and European football, winning both the European Cup and the Football League Championship, but they miss out on a "treble" by losing in the FA Cup final.
 January 18 – death of Luciano Re Cecconi (28), Lazio and Italy, who was shot during a hoax robbery
 October 1 - Pelé played the final game of his storied career at Giants Stadium in East Rutherford, New Jersey. He played the first half for his current club, the New York Cosmos, and the second half for his old Brazilian club Santos.

Australian rules football
 Victorian Football League
 May 7: Hawthorn kick 25.41 (191) against St. Kilda. That score breaks by seven the record for the most behinds by a team in a match, and by six the most scoring shots. Neither record has been equalled. 
 North Melbourne wins the 81st VFL Premiership (North Melbourne 9.22 (76) drew Collingwood Football Club 10.16 (76), replay North Melbourne 21.25 (151) d Collingwood 19.10 (124))
 Brownlow Medal awarded to Graham Teasdale (South Melbourne)

Baseball
 January 19 – Ernie Banks is elected to the Baseball Hall of Fame in his first year of eligibility. He won back-to-back MVP awards, but is best remembered for his famous line, "Let's play two".
 Sparky Lyle breaks Ron Perranoski's major league record for left-handers of 179 career saves.
 The Major League Baseball expansion Seattle Mariners and Toronto Blue Jays make their debuts (both are American League teams).  It would be the last expansion in MLB until 1993.
 World Series – The New York Yankees defeat the Los Angeles Dodgers. This is the Series in which Reggie Jackson becomes known as "Mr. October."

Basketball
 NCAA Men's Division I Basketball Championship –
 Marquette wins 67–59 over North Carolina
 NBA Finals –Portland Trail Blazers won 4 games to 2 over the Philadelphia 76ers

Boxing
 After 13 years and 82 contests, including 14 title defences, World Middleweight Champion Carlos Monzón retired undefeated.

Canadian football
 Grey Cup – Montreal Alouettes won 41–6 over the Edmonton Eskimos
 Vanier Cup – Western Ontario Mustangs win 48–15 over the Acadia Axemen

Cricket
 12–17 March, Melbourne - Centenary Test played between Australia and England to commemorate 100th anniversary of first Test match. Australia won by 45 runs, exactly the same margin as in the first Test match in 1877.
 World Series Cricket begins playing games in competition to official International Cricket Council sanctioned matches.

Cycling
 Giro d'Italia won by Michel Pollentier of Belgium
 Tour de France - Bernard Thévenet of France
 UCI Road World Championships – Men's road race – Francesco Moser of Italy

Dogsled racing
 Iditarod Trail Sled Dog Race Champion –
 Rick Swenson won with lead dogs: Andy & O.B. (Old Buddy)

Figure skating
 World Figure Skating Championships –
 Men's champion: Vladimir Kovalev, Soviet Union
 Ladies' champion: Linda Fratianne, United States
 Pair skating champions: Irina Rodnina & Alexander Zaitsev, Soviet Union
 Ice dancing champions: Irina Moiseyeva & Andrei Minenkov, Soviet Union

Golf
Men's professional
 Masters Tournament - Tom Watson
 U.S. Open - Hubert Green
 British Open - Tom Watson
 PGA Championship - Lanny Wadkins
 PGA Tour money leader - Tom Watson - $310,653
 Ryder Cup - United States won 12½ -7½ over Britain & Ireland in team golf. This was the last Ryder Cup to feature a side exclusively from the British Isles; the U.S. opponents in the next Ryder Cup, held in 1979 at White Sulphur Springs, West Virginia, would be drawn from all of Europe. The U.S.-Europe format has continued ever since.
Men's amateur
 British Amateur - Peter McEvoy
 U.S. Amateur - John Fought
Women's professional
 LPGA Championship - Chako Higuchi
 U.S. Women's Open - Hollis Stacy
 LPGA Tour money leader - Judy Rankin - $122,890

Harness racing
 United States Pacing Triple Crown races –
 Cane Pace - Jade Prince
 Little Brown Jug - Governor Skipper
 Messenger Stakes - Governor Skipper
 United States Trotting Triple Crown races –
 Hambletonian - Green Speed
 Yonkers Trot - Green Speed
 Kentucky Futurity - Texas
 Australian Inter Dominion Harness Racing Championship –
 Pacers: Stanley Rio

Horse racing
 Red Rum wins the Grand National a third time
Steeplechases
 Cheltenham Gold Cup – Davy Lad
 Grand National – Red Rum
Flat races
 Australia – Melbourne Cup won by Gold and Black
 Canada – Queen's Plate won by Sound Reason
 France – Prix de l'Arc de Triomphe won by Alleged
 Ireland – Irish Derby Stakes won by The Minstrel
 English Triple Crown Races:
 2,000 Guineas Stakes – Nebbiolo
 The Derby – The Minstrel
 St. Leger Stakes – Dunfermline
 United States Triple Crown Races:
 Kentucky Derby – Seattle Slew
 Preakness Stakes – Seattle Slew
 Belmont Stakes – Seattle Slew

Ice hockey
 Art Ross Trophy as the NHL's leading scorer during the regular season: Guy Lafleur, Montreal Canadiens
 Hart Memorial Trophy for the NHL's Most Valuable Player: Guy Lafleur - Montreal Canadiens
 Stanley Cup – Montreal Canadiens defeat the Boston Bruins 4 games to 0.
 World Hockey Championship
 Men's champion: Czechoslovakia defeated Sweden
 Junior Men's champion: Soviet Union defeated Canada
 Avco World Trophy - Quebec Nordiques won 4 games to 3 over the Winnipeg Jets

Motorsport

Radiosport
 Eighth Amateur Radio Direction Finding European Championship held in Skopje, Yugoslavia.
 First IARU Radiosport Championship held in July.

Rugby league
1977 Amco Cup
1977 European Rugby League Championship
1977 New Zealand rugby league season
1976–77 Northern Rugby Football League season / 1977–78 Northern Rugby Football League season
1977 NSWRFL season - St George and Parramatta draw 9–9 in the Grand Final.  St George takes the title by winning the replay 22–0.
1977 Pacific Cup
1977 Rugby League World Cup

Rugby union
 83rd Five Nations Championship series is won by France who complete the Grand Slam and do so by using the same 15 players in all four matches, the first time that an unchanged team has won the Grand Slam

Snooker
 World Snooker Championship – John Spencer beats Cliff Thorburn 25-12
 World rankings – Ray Reardon remains world number one for 1977/78.

Swimming
 July 3 – USA's Joseph Bottom sets a world record in the 50m freestyle at a swimming meet in Etobicoke, Ontario (Canada), clocking 23.74.

Tennis
 Grand Slam in tennis men's results:
 Australian Open - January: Roscoe Tanner - December: Vitas Gerulaitis
 French Open - Guillermo Vilas
 Wimbledon championships - Björn Borg
 U.S. Open - Guillermo Vilas
 Grand Slam in tennis women's results:
 Australian Open – January: Evonne Goolagong - December: Kerry Reid
 French Open - Mima Jaušovec
 Wimbledon championships - Virginia Wade
 U.S. Open - Chris Evert
 Davis Cup – Australia won 3–1 over Italy in world tennis.

Volleyball
 Men and Women's European Volleyball Championship held in Finland: both men's and women's tournaments won by USSR

Yacht racing
 The New York Yacht Club retains the America's Cup as media mogul Ted Turner skippers Courageous to victory over challenger Australia, of the Sun City Yacht Club, 4 races to 0

General sporting events
 Ninth Summer Universiade held in Sofia, Bulgaria

Awards
 Associated Press Male Athlete of the Year – Steve Cauthen, Horse racing
 Associated Press Female Athlete of the Year – Chris Evert, Tennis
 ABC's Wide World of Sports Athlete of the Year: Steve Cauthen, Horse Racing

References

 
Sports by year